CH Valladolid was an ice hockey team in Valladolid, Spain. They participated in the Superliga Espanola de Hockey Hielo.

History
The club was founded in 1972 as one of the six founding members of the Superliga. Due to issues with their ice rink,  they played in the Superliga during the 1973 season only, before folding.

External links
1972/73 Superliga season
Spanish Ice Hockey Federation

Valladolid
Sport in Valladolid
Valladolid
Vallladolid
1972 establishments in Spain
1973 disestablishments in Spain
Ice hockey clubs disestablished in 1973